Chrysectropa roseofasciata is species of moth in the genus Chrysectropa. It is in the subfamily Chrysopolominae. This is the only species in the genus.

Distribution 
Chrysectropa roseofasciata occurs in Angola, Cameroon, Congo, Democratic Republic of the Congo, Gabon and Sierra Leone.

References 

Limacodidae
Monotypic moth genera
Moths described in 1910
Chrysopolominae